Claudia Hernandez may refer to:

 Claudia Hernández (model) (born 1981), Peruvian TV host, model and beauty queen
 Claudia Hernández (tennis) (born 1966), Mexican tennis player
 Claudia Hernández González (born 1975), Salvadoran writer
 Claudia López Hernández (born 1970), Colombian politician. 
 Claudia Hernandez (24 character), character in the TV series 24